Jean de Bertrand (1482 – 4 December 1560) was a Roman Catholic cardinal.

Biography
On 30 Apr 1560, he was consecrated bishop by Filippo Roccabella, Bishop of Recanati.

References

1482 births
1560 deaths
16th-century French cardinals
Court of Henry II of France